The Oude Kerk (English: Old Church) is Amsterdam’s oldest building and newest art institute (since 2012). The building was founded about 1213 and consecrated in 1306 by the bishop of Utrecht with Saint Nicolas as its patron saint. After the Reformation in 1578, it became a Calvinist church, which it remains today. It stands in De Wallen, now Amsterdam's main red-light district. The square surrounding the church is the Oudekerksplein.

History

By around 1213, a wooden chapel had been erected at the location of today's Oude Kerk. Over time, this structure was replaced by a stone church that was consecrated in 1306.

The church has seen a number of renovations performed by 15 generations of Amsterdam citizens. The church stood for only a half-century before the first alterations were made; the aisles were lengthened and wrapped around the choir in a half circle to support the structure. Not long after the turn of the 15th century, north and south transepts were added to the church creating a cross formation. Work on these renovations was completed in 1460, though it is likely that progress was largely interrupted by the great fires that besieged the city in 1421 and 1452. This delayed the building for almost 1 year.

Before the Alteratie, or Reformation in Amsterdam of 1578, the Oude Kerk was Roman Catholic. Following William the Silent’s defeat of the Spanish in the Dutch Revolt, the church was taken over by the Calvinist Dutch Reformed Church. Throughout the 16th-century battles, the church was looted and defaced on numerous occasions, first in the Beeldenstorm of 1566, when a mob destroyed most of the church art and fittings, including an altarpiece with a central panel by Jan van Scorel and side panels painted on both sides by Maarten van Heemskerck.  Only the paintings on the ceiling, which were unreachable, were spared.

Locals would gather in the church to gossip, peddlers sold their goods, and beggars sought shelter. This was not tolerated by the Calvinists, however, and the homeless were expelled. In 1681, the choir was closed-off with an oak screen.  Above the screen is the text, The prolonged misuse of God's church, were here undone again in the year seventy-eight, referring to the Reformation of 1578.

In that same year, the Oude Kerk became home to the registry of marriages. It was also used as the city archives; the most important documents were locked in a chest covered with iron plates and painted with the city’s coat of arms. The chest was kept safe in the iron chapel.

The bust of famous organist and composer Jan Pieterszoon Sweelinck (1562–1621) celebrates the lifetime he spent playing in the church. His early career began at the age of fifteen when he succeeded his deceased father Pieter Swybertszoon as the Oude Kerk’s organist. He went on to compose music for all 150 Psalms and secured an international reputation as a leading Dutch composer. His music would also be played over the city from the church’s bell tower. He is buried in the church.

Rembrandt was a frequent visitor to the Oude Kerk and his children were all christened here. It is the only building in Amsterdam that remains in its original state since Rembrandt walked its halls. In the Holy Sepulchre is a small Rembrandt exhibition, a shrine to his wife Saskia van Uylenburgh who was buried here in 1642. Each year on 9 March (8 March in leap years), at 8:39 am, the early morning sun briefly illuminates her tomb. An early spring breakfast event is held annually.

Structure
The foundations were set on an artificial mound, thought to be the most solid ground of the settlement in this marshy province.

The ceiling of the Oude Kerk is the largest medieval wooden vault in Europe. The Estonian oak planks date to 1390 and boast some of the best acoustics in Europe.

The Oude Kerk contains 12 misericords, leaning posts installed underside folding seats.

Graves
The floor consists entirely of gravestones. The reason for this is that the church was built on a cemetery. Local citizens continued to be buried on the
site within the confines of the church until 1865. There are 2,500 graves in the Oude Kerk, under which are buried 10,000 Amsterdam citizens, including:

 Jacob van Heemskerck, naval hero
 Jan Pieterszoon Sweelinck, composer and organist
 Adriaen Block, trader and explorer
 Catharina Questiers, poet and dramatist
 Jacob de Graeff Dircksz., Amsterdam regent
 Andries de Graeff, Amsterdam regent
 Cornelis de Graeff, Amsterdam regent
 Catharina Hooft, woman of the Dutch golden age
 Pieter Lastman, painter
 Willem van der Zaan, Admiral
 Laurens Bake, poet
 Abraham van der Hulst, Admiral
 Saskia van Uylenburgh, Wife of Rembrandt
 Cornelis Hooft, statesman
 Jan Jacobszoon Hinlopen, merchant
 Kiliaen van Rensselaer, owner of the only successful patroonship in New Netherland, Rensselaerswyck.
 Frans Banninck Cocq, burgomaster (mayor) of Amsterdam and central figure in Rembrandts masterpiece The Night Watch
 Nicasius de Sille, Ambassador
 Caspar Commelijn, botanist
 Jan van der Heyden, painter and print maker
 Johannes Hudde, burgomaster of Amsterdam and mathematician
Lucretia Wilhelmina van Merken, dramatist and poet

Organs
The Oude Kerk holds four pipe organs, the old church organ built in 1658 and the cabinet organ built in 1767. The third was built by the German Christian Vater in 1724 and is regarded as one of the finest Baroque organs in Europe. It was acknowledged by the church Commissioners as "perfect". The organ was dismantled whilst renovations were made to the church tower in 1738, and upon reassembling it, Casper Müller made alterations to give the organ more force. It became known as the Vater-Müller organ, to acknowledge the improvement of sound. The fourth was constructed for the church by Organi Puccini of Pisa in 2010. Beginning in spring of 2019 the completely restored Vater-Müller organ will again be played.

Today
The Oude Kerk is now a centre for contemporary art and heritage. Artists including Nicolas Jaar, Marinus Boezem, Christian Boltanski, Janet Cardiff and George Bures Miller were commissioned by the Oude Kerk to create site-specific installations. The church also has a permanent exhibit on its history and that of the city of Amsterdam.

In mid-March each year, Catholics arrive at the Oude Kerk to celebrate the "Miracle of Amsterdam" that occurred in 1345. After taking communion, a dying man vomited the Host. When his vomit was thrown into a fire, the Host did not burn and was proclaimed a miracle. The Host was put in a chest and installed at the Oude Kerk; however, it disappeared during the Reformation.

See also
 History of early modern period domes

Gallery

References

External links

Oude Kerk – official site
Oude Kerk congregation – Protestant congregation of the Oude Kerk 
Typisch Amsterdams – Oude Kerk – history and architecture of the Oude Kerk. 
Amsterdam Oude Kerk Organs – Visitor's information and details about Oude Kerk's organs and history

Bell towers in the Netherlands
Churches in Amsterdam
Rijksmonuments in Amsterdam
1213 establishments in Europe
Towers in Amsterdam